Jerrel Wolfgang (born 8 January 1984 in Almelo, Netherlands) is a Dutch footballer who played for Eerste Divisie club Helmond Sport during the 2005–06 season.

References

External links
voetbal international profile

1984 births
Living people
Dutch footballers
Helmond Sport players
Eerste Divisie players
Sportspeople from Almelo
Association footballers not categorized by position
Footballers from Overijssel